The Arsenal Stadium is a multi-use stadium in Tula, Russia. It is used mostly for FC Arsenal Tula football matches. The stadium was constructed in 1959 and holds 20,048 people

References

Football venues in Russia
FC Arsenal Tula
Sport in Tula, Russia
Sports venues completed in 1959